Thekkumbhagom  is a village in Ernakulam district in the Indian state of Kerala.

Location

Demographics
 India census, Thekkumbhagom had a population of 11026 with 5560 males and 5466 females.

References

Villages in Ernakulam district